Roeton is an unincorporated community in Coffee County, Alabama, United States.

History
The community is likely named after a local family. A post office operated under the name Roeton from 1901 to 1905.

References

Unincorporated communities in Coffee County, Alabama
Unincorporated communities in Alabama